Daniel James Gonzalez (born June 12, 1994) is an American commentary YouTuber and musician who originally came to prominence for his short comedy sketches on Vine in 2014. He created his main YouTube channel that same year, subsequently moving over to YouTube full-time when Vine closed down in 2017. His three personal channels and three group channels have collectively earned around  million subscribers, and  billion views,

Personal life

Daniel James Gonzalez was born in Chicago, Illinois on June 12, 1994, and grew up in Wheaton, Illinois. He attended Wheaton North High School, before attending the Georgia Institute of Technology where he graduated with a Bachelor of Science degree in computational media.

Gonzalez married Laura Fuechsl on July 1, 2017.

Career 
Gonzalez began his career on Vine making six-second comedy sketches. He later participated in Camp Unplug, a 2016 Vine mini-series, during which he met Drew Gooden. Gonzalez accumulated about 2.9 million Vine followers before the service shut down. In 2014, while still on Vine, he created and started uploading videos to his YouTube channel.

From 2017 to 2018, Gonzalez wrote, edited, and starred in various shorts and "Corridor Crew" videos for Corridor Digital. In 2019, he and Gooden headlined the "We are Two Different People" comedy tour with Kurtis Conner as the opener. The tour was named as such due to the similarities between Gooden and Gonzalez, both being self-described "skinny white guys on the internet".

YouTube style 
Gonzalez's videos are often commentary on different aspects of Internet culture, criticism of YouTube, B movies, and general cultural criticism. His 2018 Troom Troom reaction videos popularized the channel. He is known for his criticisms of Jake and Logan Paul, and for his commentaries on Musical.ly (later TikTok) stars. In addition to commentary videos, he is also known for his parody music. He refers to his fanbase by the singular name "Greg".

Gonzalez is associated with fellow YouTubers Drew Gooden, Kurtis Conner, and Cody Ko.

Awards and nominations

Discography

EPs

Singles

Notes

References

Primary sources 

1994 births
Living people
American male comedians
American parodists
American YouTubers
Comedians from Illinois
Comedy YouTubers
Music YouTubers
Commentary YouTubers
YouTube vloggers
Vine (service) celebrities
People from Chicago
Georgia Tech alumni
American people of Mexican descent